The Kent County Civil War Monument is an historic landmark in  Grand Rapids, Michigan.  The monument is in a small triangular downtown park, bounded by Division Avenue and Monroe Avenue.  It was listed on the National Register of Historic Places in 2004.

History
Plans for the monument were made, and fundraising started, before the end of the American Civil War. However, the effort languished until 1884, when the upcoming Seventeenth Annual Reunion of the Society of the Army of the Cumberland generated renewed interest. More funds were raised, and the Detroit Bronze Company, a subsidiary of the Monumental Bronze Company of Bridgeport, Connecticut, was hired to create the statuary. The monument was dedicated on September 17, 1885, during the Reunion. The dedication was attended by  Governor Russell A. Alger and General Philip H. Sheridan, among others. The monument was restored in 2003, and again in 2014.

Description
The Kent County Civil War Monument is a thirty-four foot high monumental fountain, standing in the center of a sixteen-foot diameter basin. The monument itself has a seven-foot high base, three square upper sections above, with a Union soldier at parade rest at the top. The monument contains substantial detail, including eagles, flags, and military devices and equipment, as well as the names and dates of various Civil War battles. Detail also include portraits of Abraham Lincoln, Ulysses S. Grant, James Garfield, and Admiral David Farragut; a bas relief panel entitled "Woman's Mission of Mercy," showing a woman helping a wounded soldier; quotations from Lincoln, Grant, Garfield, and Andrew Jackson; and plaques with the Michigan state seal and Grand Army of the Republic insignia.  As was typical of many such monuments, the memorial was cast in zinc.

References

1885 sculptures
Buildings and structures in Grand Rapids, Michigan
Monuments and memorials on the National Register of Historic Places in Michigan
National Register of Historic Places in Kent County, Michigan
Tourist attractions in Grand Rapids, Michigan
Union (American Civil War) monuments and memorials in Michigan
Zinc sculptures in the United States